Makhtyata is a rural locality (a village) in Beryozovsky District, Perm Krai, Russia. The population was 26 as of 2010.

Geography 
Makhtyata is located 15 km northeast of  Beryozovka (the district's administrative centre) by road. Malaya Sosnovka is the nearest rural locality.

References 

Rural localities in Beryozovsky District, Perm Krai